Emilie Maureen Townes (born August 1, 1955, Durham, North Carolina) is an American Christian social ethicist and theologian, currently Dean and E. Rhodes and Leona B. Carpenter Professor of Womanist Ethics and Society at the Vanderbilt University Divinity School. She was the first African-American woman to be elected president of the American Academy of Religion in 2008 and served as president of the Society for the Study of Black Religion from 2013–2016.

Education and career 
Townes holds degrees from the University of Chicago (AB in Religion in the Humanities, AM in Religion, DMin) and from the joint Garrett-Evangelical Theological Seminary/Northwestern University program (PhD). She taught at Saint Paul School of Theology, Union Theological Seminary in New York, and Yale Divinity School, holding named chairs at both Union and Yale. In 2013 she became Dean of Vanderbilt Divinity School. She has been an ordained American Baptist minister since 1980.

Honors 

 Elected to American Academy of Arts and Sciences, 2009.  
 Pacesetter Award from the American Association of Blacks in Higher Education, 2015.

Major works

Books 

 Womanist Ethics and the Cultural Production of Evil (Palgrave Macmillan Press, 2006). 
 Breaking the Fine Rain of Death: African American Health Care and a Womanist Ethic of Care (Continuum, 1998).
 In a Blaze of Glory: Womanist Spirituality as Social Witness (Abingdon Press, 1995). 
 Womanist Justice, Womanist Hope (Scholars Press, 1993).

Co-edited books 

 With Katie Geneva Cannon and Angela D. Simms:  Womanist Theological Ethics: A Reader (Westminster John Knox Press, 2011) 
 With Stephanie Y. Mitchem: Religion, Health, and Healing in African American Life (Praeger, 2008)

References

Vanderbilt University faculty
American theologians
University of Chicago Divinity School alumni
1955 births
Living people